Amsterdam, officially eMvelo, is a small town located in Mkhondo Local Municipality, Mpumalanga South Africa. Amsterdam encompasses a large Swazi population as a result of its proximity to the Eswatini border which is relatively close to the area. The town is located some 77 km east of Ermelo. There are large plantations of gum, pine and wattle trees in the area. The town also boast of a peaceful community with rich culture and heritage.

History
Part of a Scottish settlement established by Alexander McCorkindale in 1868, it was proclaimed a town in June 1881. At first called Roburnia, in honour of Scottish Poet Robert Burns, the name was changed on 5 July 1882 to Amsterdam, after the Dutch city where the State Secretary, Eduard Bok, was born, and out of gratitude for Dutch sympathy during the First Anglo-Boer War (1880-1881).

References

 Carleton Jones High School year book 1992

Populated places in the Mkhondo Local Municipality
Populated places established in 1866
1866 establishments in Africa